Star Wars and Other Galactic Funk is a disco album by Meco released in 1977. The album uses various musical themes from the Star Wars soundtrack arranged as instrumental disco music. A single from the album, "Star Wars Theme/Cantina Band", reached number one on the Billboard Hot 100 on October 1, 1977, holding to that position for two weeks.  The album and single were both certified Platinum, for sales of one million albums and two million singles, on June 8, 1978.

The complete contents of the album are also available on the 1997 Mercury compilation "The Best of Meco".

Track listing
Star Wars (15:49) LP side 1
"Title Theme"
"Imperial Attack"
"The Desert & the Robot Auction"
"The Princess Appears"
"The Land of the Sand People"
"Princess Leia's Theme"
"Cantina Band"
"The Last Battle"
"The Throne Room & End Title"
Other Galactic Funk (12:31) LP side 2
"Other" (4:07)
"Galactic" (5:02)
"Funk" (3:21)
"Star Wars Theme – Cantina Band" (7" edit) (3:32) - bonus track on CD only
"Star Wars Theme – Cantina Band" (12" disco mix) (7:34) - bonus track on CD only

LP Side 1 / CD Tracks 1, 3 and 4 - Composer: John Williams

LP Side 2 / CD Track 2 - Composers: Solomon Smith and Harold Wheeler

Personnel
Drasan Thims (Sandra Smith), Harold Wheeler, Pat Rebillot: Keyboards
Suzanne Ciani: Special Musical and Sound Effects (as created on a Buchla synthesizer)
Tony Bongiovi: Studio tape effects, guitars
Cliff Morris, David Spinozza, John Tropea, Lamer Murhab, Lance Quinn, Simm Tenaj: Guitars
Neil Jason, Bob Walters, Will Lee: Bass
Allan Schwartzberg, Steve Gadd, Dor McBrene, Jimmy Young: Drums
Anthony Eversley, Dave Carey, John Purcell, Kendall Turner, Kirk Parson, Nor Thornaring, Meco, Rubens Bassini, Solomon Smith, Thomas Simons, Timothy Thompson, Vincent Lilly: Percussion
Eddie Bert: Trombone
Jon Faddis, Alan Rubin, Lew Soloff & Randy Brecker: Trumpets

Charts

Album

Singles

Production 
 Recorded at MZH Studio in New York, New York.
 Electronic musical effects were created on a Buchla synthesizer by Suzanne Ciani.

References

External links
[ Allmusic link] with chart positions.

1977 debut albums
Music of Star Wars
Albums produced by Tony Bongiovi
Albums produced by Harold Wheeler (musician)
Casablanca Records albums
Meco albums